Podosphaera fuliginea (also known as Podosphaera xanthii) is a plant pathogen that causes powdery mildew on cucurbits. Podosphaera fuliginea and Erysiphe cichoracearum are the two most commonly recorded fungi causing cucurbit powdery mildew. In the past, Erysiphe cichoracearum was considered to be the primary causal organism throughout most of the world. Today, Podosphaera fuliginea is more commonly reported.

Signs and symptoms 
Powdery mildew is manifest on the plant by white powdery fungal growth on the surface of the leaf, usually both sides of the leaf show fungal growth. The host tissue is frequently stunted, distorted, discolored, and scarred. The fruit of infected plants are usually smaller and the flavor is affected negatively, as fewer sugars and solids are stored in the fruit.

Disease cycle 
Podosphaera fuliginea uses haustoria to gain access to the leaf epidermal cells. The fungus is usually spread during the spring through mycelium from infected plant, or through ascocarps.  Signs appear after 3–7 days of infection if conditions are favorable.  The mycelium grows rapidly during the warm summer months with an optimum temperature of about 10-32°C (50-90 degrees F). The leaves are most susceptible 16–23 days after unfolding. High humidity favors the development of disease, but infection can occur at  relative humidity as low a 50%. The conidia of the fungus are spread through the air and thus can travel over great distances. The mycelium can also overwinter in the buds of infected plants.

Control 
The most common way to control the spread of Podosphaera fuliginea is with the use of fungicides. Usually sulphur or demethylation inhibitor fungicides are applied. Fungicides are usually applied once a week. Plants should also be kept physically separated to control spread because older plants can be a source of conidia. Fungicide application is not sufficient if the plant's silicon nutrition is insufficient, and added silicon may protect almost entirely without need for other methods.

References 

Fungal plant pathogens and diseases
Vegetable diseases
fuliginea
Fungi described in 1832